Friedrich Friedrichs (1895-1918) was a German First World War fighter ace credited with either 20 or 21 confirmed aerial victories as a member of fighter squadron Jagdstaffel 10. As one of the few pilots courageous enough to be a balloon buster, he destroyed 11 of the crucial artillery direction posts.

The victory list
The victories of Friedrich Friedrichs are reported in chronological order, which is not necessarily the order or dates the victories were confirmed by headquarters.
Abbreviations were expanded by the editor creating this list.

Footnote

Citations

Friedrichs, Friedrich
Aerial victories of Friedrichs, Friedrich